The North East Line (NEL) is a high-capacity Mass Rapid Transit (MRT) line in Singapore. Operated by SBS Transit, the  line is the MRT's shortest. It runs from HarbourFront station in southern Singapore to Punggol station in the northeast, serving 16 stations via Chinatown, Little India, Serangoon and Hougang. Coloured purple on official maps, it is Singapore's third MRT line and the country's first fully-automated underground rail line.

The NEL was planned during the 1980s and 1990s to alleviate traffic congestion on roads leading to the northeast suburbs. However, the project was delayed due to lack of demand at the time. After the government's decision to go ahead, its alignment and stations were finalised in 1996. Completed at a cost of S$5 billion, the line began operations on 20 June 2003. Two stations did not open with the rest of the line; Buangkok station opened on 15 January 2006, and Woodleigh station began operations on 20 June 2011. A one-station extension to Punggol Coast station, under construction, is expected to be completed in 2024.

The driverless line uses the moving-block Alstom Urbalis 300 CBTC signalling system. Alstom rolling stock – C751A and C751C – is used on the NEL, which is powered by an overhead line. The NEL is Singapore's first Art-in-Transit line, with 18 artworks displayed in its 16 stations.  Each station is wheelchair-accessible via lifts and ramps, with tactile routes to guide the visually-impaired. Most of the stations are designated as Civil Defence shelters, designed to accommodate 7,500 people and withstand airstrikes and chemical attacks.

History

Planning

The Mass Rapid Transit Corporation (MRTC) first proposed an additional MRT line serving the northeastern areas of Punggol and Jalan Kayu in September 1984. In its preliminary studies, the Communications Ministry concluded that roads would be inadequate for projected traffic into the planned 21st-century housing estates. To minimise the impact on other development, the Ministry developed plans to determine which parcels of land would be needed for its construction. In December of that year, a British consultancy team consisting of Sir William Halcrow and Partners, Merz & McLellan and London Transport International was appointed by the MRTC to look into possible routes for the line.

In March 1986, the British consultants drew up a tentative route from Outram Park to Punggol. The line would connect to the existing MRT system at Dhoby Ghaut station and pass through Kandang Kerbau and Hougang, paralleling the major Serangoon and Upper Serangoon Roads. A branch line from Hougang to Jalan Kayu was also proposed. The segment of the line in the city would be underground, and the northern portion after Braddell Road would be elevated. The MRTC, which approved the project in October 1986, proposed that the line link to Bishan Depot (which would maintain and service its trains). In February 1991, it was proposed to extend the line to Pulau Tekong via Pulau Ubin to serve future residential and industrial developments in the long-term plans for these islands.

Delay
Although the government approved the NEL "in principle" in January 1989, Communications Minister Yeo Ning Hong said that the line's construction was dependent on development in the northeast. The Woodlands extension, which cost S$1.35 billion (US$ billion), took precedence over the S$4.3 billion (US$ billion) NEL. According to Yeo's successor, Mah Bow Tan, there were firmer plans for development around the Woodlands extension, unlike in the northeast, where the low population meant that the NEL would not be as cost-effective. The four Members of Parliament (MPs) for the northeast called for the line to be built sooner, saying that there would be sufficient demand (given the area's population) and it would relieve traffic congestion.

Reviewing the line's feasibility, the Communications Ministry said in 1995 that the NEL  could be completed in 2002 if construction began promptly. It was projected to cost S$5 billion (US$ billion) and would operate at a loss of S$250 million (US$ million) during its first four years, with lower daily passenger numbers (240,000). The ministry recommended construction of the NEL to the Cabinet, citing "wider benefits" such as reduced travelling time and reliance on cars.

Mah, engaging with grassroots leaders in October 1995, said that residents would have to be prepared to pay higher fares on the NEL to cover the line's cost and initial losses. His position was divisive; some leaders felt that it would be unfair to the residents, and others were confident that residents would be willing "to pay for a better quality of life". Increased fares for the entire network were also suggested, but Mah said that it would be more difficult to implement. He assured leaders that he would recommend construction of the line to the government.

A white paper released on 2 January 1996 said that the NEL would be built earlier to address congestion in the northeast corridor, which would also be relieved by express bus service. The government's announcement during a 19 January parliamentary debate on the report that it had decided to build the NEL "immediately" was greeted with applause.

Construction and opening

The 16 NEL stations and their locations were announced on 4 March 1996. Many residents and politicians welcomed the announcement, since the line was expected to relieve traffic congestion, improve transport in the northeast and stimulate development around the stations. Thirteen civil contracts for track work and construction of the stations, Sengkang Depot and associated tunnels were awarded for a total of S$2.8 billion (US$ billion). Sixteen more contracts related to electrical and mechanical work were awarded for a total of S$1 billion (US$ billion).

Several rental HDB blocks, private homes and shops were acquired, dismaying many affected residents. Those who had been asked to relocate in July 1996 requested more time to find new premises. Construction of the line began with a groundbreaking ceremony at Farrer Park station on 25 November 1997. On 20 May 1999, SBS Transit (then Singapore Bus Service) was appointed to operate the line along with the Sengkang and Punggol LRT systems. With bus operations in the area handed over from Trans-Island Bus Services (TIBS) to the newly-appointed operator, SBS controlled northeastern bus and rail service; this provided the inter-modal integration desired by the government.

Construction challenges on the line included diverting the Eu Tong Seng canal for construction of the Chinatown station, and avoiding flooding the tunnels and stations while boring tunnels under the Singapore River between the Clarke Quay and Dhoby Ghaut stations. At the Outram Park station, an arched roof of cement-filled steel pipes was laid underneath the EWL tunnels to minimise movement. Jet-grout arches were used to support the North-South line (NSL) tunnels when explosives were used to remove rock while tunnelling from Clarke Quay to Dhoby Ghaut. Roads around the line had to be temporarily diverted for construction.

When the 16 stations were announced, Potong Pasir (then named Sennett), Woodleigh and Punggol were planned to be built as shell stations due to lack of development around the station sites. It was later decided to build these stations in full as it would have been more costly to wait until later to complete the stations from the structural shells. In 1998, the timeline for Punggol station was moved up because of planned housing developments in the area. The decision not to build Sennett station generated political controversy, however, with claims by residents and opposition MP Chiam See Tong that the station would only open if the ruling People's Action Party (PAP) secured the constituency. In 2002, after a revised ridership study, the government decided to open the station with the other NEL stations due to projected developments around the site; the station also received its present name.

The NEL was initially expected to be completed by the end of 2002, with SBS staff trained in train maintenance and other technical aspects of the automated system. However, the Land Transport Authority (LTA) said in September 2002 that the line might be opened in April 2003 to allow sufficient time for testing. The line's systems were handed over to SBS Transit on 16 December, and the operator conducted further tests. The NEL's opening was delayed until June due to a glitch in the signalling system, however, with tests briefly handed over to the LTA. Since it had to bear the costs of maintenance and manpower, SBS Transit sought compensation from the government for the delay.

Except for two stations (Buangkok and Woodleigh), the NEL began operations on 20 June 2003. About 140,000 people rode the line on its opening day. The line's opening ceremony was held on 28 August. Although the NEL has experienced a few glitches since its opening, it has been reliable and generally well-received by commuters. The International Association of Public Transport called the NEL a model public-transport system for the future in July 2003, with other driverless systems planned around the world. SBS Transit reported in June 2004 that the line averaged one 15-minute delay every six weeks, compared to expected twice-a-week delays.

Opening of reserved stations

On 17 June 2003, SBS Transit announced that the Woodleigh and Buangkok stations would not open with the other NEL stations. Due to the lack of development, the operator said keeping the stations closed would reduce operating costs by S$2–3 million. Residents around the line were upset by the sudden decision to keep Buangkok station closed, since they had been assured by MPs and grassroots leaders that it would be opened.

The government initially stood by SBS Transit's decision to keep the station closed, planning to open it in 2006 when more residential flats would be in the area. The opening was further postponed to 2008, following projected housing-development plans for the area. After public pressure and promises by residents to use the station, SBS Transit announced at the end of 2005 that it would open the station on 15 January 2006.

The Buangkok station opened as scheduled "with much fanfare". Since its opening, however, the station averaged only 1,386 daily riders instead of the expected 6,000. Many residents still traveled to the adjacent Sengkang and Hougang stations due to their amenities. SBS Transit, after saying that it was still "too early to draw a conclusion" about ridership, remained committed to keeping the station open to serve future developments nearby.

Woodleigh station, built near the former Bidadari cemetery, was scheduled to open seven or eight years after the rest of the line. In January 2011, The Straits Times reported that preparations for the station's opening had been ongoing since the second half of 2010; the newspaper speculated that the station would open in mid-2011 to serve new developments in the area. In a March parliamentary session, Transport Minister Raymond Lim confirmed that the station would open on 20 June 2011. SBS deployed several staff members to assist confused commuters who alighted at Woodleigh station instead of the adjacent Serangoon station. Others alighted to view the station's interior or try an alternative route from the station.

North East Line extension (NELe)

On 17 January 2013, transport minister Lui Tuck Yew announced a one-station extension of the NEL to serve upcoming developments in Punggol North. Although it was initially planned to extend the line by 2030, Second Minister for Transport Ng Chee Meng announced on 7 June 2017 that the  extension would be moved up to 2023 in conjunction with development plans for the area.

The contract for the extension was awarded to China State Construction Engineering Corporation Limited (Singapore Branch) in December, and construction began that month. Although tunneling was completed on 13 November 2020, transport minister Ong Ye Kung said at the tunnel breakthrough ceremony that the Punggol Coast station's completion would be delayed until 2024 due to delays caused by the COVID-19 pandemic.

Network and operations

Service

In 2022, the NEL had a daily ridership of 527,000. The line operates between 5:30am and 12:30am. On weekdays and Saturdays, the first train leaves Punggol (the northern terminus) at 5:42am; the last train leaves HarbourFront, the southern terminus, at 11:56pm. Trains run every 2.5 to 5 minutes, and the line's total travel time is 32 minutes.

The NEL initially had a higher fare than the North South and East West lines due to greater operating costs. On 30 December 2016, however, fares were lowered to match the other lines with a "purely distance-based approach". This revision, made after a fare review by the Public Transport Council, was intended to minimise commuter confusion.

The first line operated by SBS Transit, the NEL has been part of the New Rail Financing Framework (NRFF) since 2018. Previously, the operator (the owner of the rail assets) had to bear the cost of maintaining and upgrading trains and signalling. Under the NRFF, the Land Transport Authority and SBS Transit will share the profits and financial risks in operating the line and the LTA will take control of its operating assets on 1 April 2033. SBS Transit will operate the line under a 15-year licence which will expire on 31 March 2033.

Route
As its name implies, the fully-underground  NEL runs from Singapore's city centre to the northeastern parts of the island. The line goes northeast from HarbourFront station, paralleling New Bridge Road and Eu Tong Street in Chinatown between the Outram Park and Clarke Quay stations. Passing under the Singapore River and Fort Canning Hill to Dhoby Ghaut station, it continues north to Little India station under Bukit Timah Road. Following Race Course Road and Serangoon Road through Little India and Boon Keng, it crosses the Whampoa and Kallang Rivers before reaching Potong Pasir.

Between the Potong Pasir and Kovan stations, the NEL parallels Upper Serangoon Road before curving north to Hougang station. The line then runs along Hougang Avenue 6 and Sengkang Central to Sengkang station in Sengkang and its terminus in Punggol. The NEL is expected to continue towards the Punggol Coast station in 2024, curving east past Punggol. The line is coloured purple on official maps.

Stations
The line has 16 stations from HarbourFront to Punggol. Six stations connect to other MRT lines. Punggol Coast, the seventeenth station on the line, will open in 2024. A station designated "NE2", which was included in the 1991 master plan between HarbourFront and Outram Park, may be built if development warrants it.

Culture

Architecture

Each of the 16 NEL stations has a unique design which reflects its location. The HarbourFront station has a maritime theme, with an elliptical ship's-hull motif used for the ceiling and concourse entrances to the platforms. At Little India, the station walls' metal grills have leaf-shaped patterns similar to the door patterns of Hindu prayer rooms. The station's design was intended to reflect Indian traditions.

Station entrances use glass, allowing natural lighting during the day. Exit A of the Chinatown station has a transparent pavilion-style roof, which allows natural light and provides an unobstructed view of the shophouses along Pagoda Street. At Serangoon, each of its four triangular-shaped entrances is painted a different colour and enclosed in a cubic structure. Unlike at the other NEL stations, the entrances to Buangkok do not use glass; white Teflon sheets are supported by metal frames.

Dhoby Ghaut station is the MRT network's largest, and the five-level station is integrated with the twin-towered office complex Atrium@Orchard above it. The network's first such integration of an MRT station with a commercial development, it permits more efficient land use and improves access to public transport. The station's NEL platforms,  underground, are some of the MRT's deepest.

The four-level Sengkang station is an integrated hub, with Singapore's three public-transport modes – MRT, LRT and bus – serving the Sengkang area. The MRT/LRT station was the MRT network's first intermodal station for all three transport modes. In addition to its transport facilities, the station is integrated with the Compass Heights and Compass Point developments.

Designed by the 3HPArchitects and Farrells architectural firms, the Punggol station is integrated with the LRT station and the bus interchange. Its curved aluminium and stainless-steel cladding gives the station a futuristic look befitting the Punggol 21 developments. Covering  along Punggol Central to accommodate bus stops, taxi stands and passenger drop-off points along the road, the station is the NEL's longest.

Artworks
The line introduced the MRT's Art in Transit (AiT) programme, which showcases art in the network. Eighteen works by 19 artists are featured in its stations. Artists were selected by an art-review panel, which reviewed the artists' portfolios and managed conceptual development. Considered a "significant milestone" for public art in Singapore, AiT aims to enhance the riding experience. Unlike artwork in the original North–South and East–West Line (NSEWL) stations, the works must be integrated into a station's design and reflect the history and heritage of its surroundings.

Infrastructure

Rolling stock

The NEL's rolling stock has six-car electric multiple unit (EMU) trains, with four doors per side on each carriage, and can accommodate up to 1,920 passengers per trainset. Twenty-five first-generation Alstom Metropolis C751A trains were ordered, built in France by Alstom in 2000 and 2001. An additional 18 second-generation Alstom Metropolis C751C trains, an updated version of the C751A, were delivered to Singapore beginning in July 2014 and were built in Shanghai between 2014 and 2016. To increase the line extension's passenger capacity, an additional six third-generation Alstom Metropolis C851E trains were ordered; the first trainset arrived in Singapore on 4 April 2021. The C851E is built in Barcelona, beginning in 2020.

The automatic trains are controlled by an operations control centre (OCC) at Sengkang Depot. The fleet's brake systems permit smooth, quiet stopping. Train speeds can reach . Safety features include closed-circuit television cameras for train interiors and a passenger emergency communications system which allows communication between passengers and the OCC. The trains have wide seats and dedicated space for wheelchair users.

The trains are made of fire-resistant materials and include  fire and smoke detectors and a fire barrier under its frame. They have a pair of beams (rail guards) which detect obstacles in the train's path; smaller debris is swept away, and the train automatically stops if the beams detect larger objects. A 1500V overhead catenary system (OCS) powers the trains, the MRT network's first electrical system of that type. The OCS provides a safer environment for maintenance workers on the tracks and is less expensive, with a smaller conductor. In an emergency when the train is stopped, the doors on both sides can be opened easily without electricity and ramps lower for passenger evacuation in the tunnels.

In 2019, the first-generation trains began undergoing a mid-life refurbishment which is scheduled for completion during the third quarter of 2024. Upgrades include the replacement of interior parts and the installation of a new condition-monitoring system which will monitor train performance. The first refurbished train re-entered service on 28 February 2022.

With the passenger trains, the NEL tunnels and tracks are maintained by a fleet of engineering trains. There are four types of engineering trains: the locomotive, for towing wagons with equipment; the heavy crane vehicle, for changing tracks; the multi-function vehicle, for detecting flaws on rails and in tunnels; and the rail-grinding machine, for grinding rails back into shape. The engineering trains are manufactured by Plasser & Theurer, Speno, and Harsco Rail. A new fleet of engineering trains has been supplied by CRRC Zhuzhou Locomotive.

Depot

The Sengkang Depot, on Sengkang East Avenue between the Buangkok and Sengkang stations, is the service and storage area for NEL trains. Built by Hyundai Engineering and Construction for S$350 million (US$ million), the  depot includes the OCC which monitors the line's train and station operations.

The depot can accommodate up to 44 trains, with three additional stabling tracks being built for the NELe as of 2019. It also houses LRT trains for the Sengkang and Punggol LRT lines above the depot.

Its facilities include a four-storey administrative building, maintenance bays, a workshop and an automated warehouse. The depot's workshop has equipment which can raise an entire train for repairs, Singapore's first such workshop. Using the NEL's signalling system, train movement in the depot is mainly automatic. Staff members access the area via three dedicated tunnels for safety reasons.

The OCC also controls the equipment and systems of tunnels, stations, power substations and the depot, which are integrated into one terminal. The systems are managed by four or five rotating teams working around the clock. Alongside a training and software-development room, the OCC has a depot control centre to monitor and supervise its operations.

Signalling
The NEL is fully automatic, using Alstom's Urbalis 300 moving-block signalling system. The NEL is the world's first fully automated heavy-rail system. Its construction allowed the Land Transport Authority to explore, integrate and implement new and existing technology as part of its vision of a fully-automated system. The line's automatic train control (ATC) is based on Alstom's MASTRIA software, which also manages its automatic train protection (ATP) and automatic train operation (ATO). The Urbalis system also includes a computer-based Interlocking system which controls the track switches and interfaces with the ATC and the data-management system. The DMS, monitored by station staff, oversees the signalling equipment, platform doors and trains.

The ATP system maintains a buffer between trains. Using microwave technology,  the IAGO waveguide (Informatisation et Automatisation par Guide d’Onde or waveguide transmission line system for computer and automation applications) allows two-way communication between trains and monitors the trains' positions and movements. If a train enters the buffer, the ATP automatically adjusts the train's speed.

At least 500 computer systems control the NEL. In case of a glitch, backup systems would take over; the system would "go to sleep" if it experiences a severe malfunction. In the event of system failure, drivers would be deployed to manually operate the trains. The NEL maintains its "mean kilometres between failures" target of one million train-km ( train-miles). As part of an NEL refurbishment programme announced on 17 December 2018, parts of the power and signalling systems were serviced and new rail crossings and tracks installed.

Station facilities

Passenger service centres
Every station has a passenger service centre (PSC) on its concourse. The PSCs are generally curved, unlike the boxier designs of those in older MRT stations. In addition to assisting passengers and checking and topping up their fare cards, the PSC staff monitors and controls the functions of connecting tunnels and communicates with the OCC at the depot. When a station is used as a civil-defence (CD) shelter, the PSC becomes its command centre.

Lifts and escalators
Each NEL station is equipped with "energy-smart" Otis escalators connecting its levels. Their speed is reduced by half when not in use by commuters, reducing energy consumption and wear and tear. In addition to escalators, Dhoby Ghaut is the first MRT station with a set of  travellators which link the NEL and NSL platforms.

All NEL stations have lifts which provide step-free access to their platforms. Most of the lifts have glass doors, which improve appearance and enhance security. Each lift has a communications system, connected to the station's PSC. If a lift stalls during a station blackout, a battery-powered backup system provides lighting and ventilation for four hours.

Accessibility

In compliance with Singapore's Code on Barrier-Free Accessibility, NEL stations have wheelchair-friendly facilities. Each station has an entrance with barrier-free access via lifts and ramps, in contrast to older stations on previous lines which are being retrofitted.

The NEL has the MRT's first tactile system. Consisting of tiles with raised rounded or elongated studs, the system intends to guide visually-impaired commuters through a station on a dedicated route from entrance to platforms. Station seats have armrests to assist those who have difficulty getting up.

These accessibility features were part of the recommendations of a Land Transport Authority working group set up to improve accessibility on the MRT network. Associations representing the disabled were also consulted. The group completed its findings in 1999; only some of its recommendations had been adopted by 2003, since station infrastructure was nearly completed by then.

Safety

Westinghouse platform screen doors (PSDs) are a safety barrier between passengers on platforms and trains. The PSDs enable climate control in a station, minimising the loss of cool air from the platforms and preventing warm air from entering the station from the tunnels. A total of 768 PSDs were supplied to the NEL's 16 stations. The Punggol Coast station's PSDs will be supplied by ST Engineering Electronics. The platforms have emergency-stop plungers (ESPs) to halt trains in an emergency.

More than 10,000 smoke and heat detectors are installed in the NEL's stations as part of the line's fire-alarm system. The alarm, which automatically alerts SBS Transit of any faults in the system, is integrated with the public address system; instead of alarm bells, pre-recorded messages would assist commuters in evacuating. In addition to the detectors, sprinkler and hose reel systems, dry riser pipeworks and an inert-gas system would contain a fire.

During a fire, escalators could be shut down remotely from the PSC and the fare gates opened for evacuation. The air-conditioning system would be shut down to minimise re-circulation of smoke. An installed "smoke curtain" system controls smoke movement, and automatic smoke-extraction fans remove any contained smoke.

Civil defence

Except for three stations (Dhoby Ghaut, Sengkang and Punggol), NEL stations are designated civil-defence (CD) shelters. Each CD station is designed to accommodate at least 7,500 people and withstand airstrikes and chemical attacks. Equipment essential for shelter operations is mounted on shock absorbers to prevent damage during a bombing. When electricity supply to the shelter is disrupted, backup generators are used.

During emergencies, large sliding doors would seal the entrances and the tunnel portals would be manually sealed by blast doors. The shelters have built-in decontamination chambers and dry toilets, with collection bins which would remove human waste from the shelter. The toilets are next to an exhaust ventilation outlet, to remove odors.

Notes and references

Notes

References

Bibliography

External links
 
 North East Line (Official LTA website)
 North East Line (SBS Transit)

Mass Rapid Transit (Singapore) lines
Railway lines opened in 2003
2003 establishments in Singapore